Eldon Leroy Foltz  (March 28, 1919 - August 10, 2013) was born in Fort Collins, Colorado, Eldon L. Foltz grew up in East Lansing, Michigan. His father was Professor of Electrical Engineering at Michigan State University, and Foltz himself would go on to have a distinguished career as an academic and neurosurgeon.

Education 

In 1941 Foltz graduated from Michigan State University (B.S., Magna Cum Laude). He went on to the University of Michigan Medical School in 1943 (M.D.), doing a combined scholar program with Michigan State.

Having graduated from medical school and done a surgical internship at the University of Michigan, Foltz joined the United States Navy Corps. He served for 30 months of active duty in the South Pacific.

Next Foltz did a year of general surgery residency at the University of Michigan and became a graduate student in neuroanatomy and neuropathology. His residency in neurosurgery was at Dartmouth Medical School, where he studied under Henry Heyl. In 1950 he finished residency at the University of Louisville, where he had studied with Dr. Glen Spurling.

In order to study the limbic system Foltz became a post-doctoral fellow at The National Institute of Mental Health.

Career 

Foltz’ initial research concerned "coma of head injury." He studied monkeys with electrodes implanted in the reticular system and also cortical electrodes. He used evoked responses to demonstrate a selective depression of electrical activity in the reticular formation by the cerebral concussion, with minimal effect on primary ascending sensory pathways. The effect was reversed (in part) by atropine therapy.

"Psychosomatic disease states in monkeys and the limbic system" was the result of Foltz’ investigation of chaired "executive" monkeys. They were trained to conditioned avoidance and "conditioned stress," and monitored as to agitate states by the degree of lever pulling and the effect on intestinal motility (direct contraction measurements). The study proved that cingulotomy reduced the agitated responses, thus modifying lever pulling to an efficient level and reducing the increased gut motility.

As he oversaw pediatric neurosurgical service at Children's Hospital in Seattle, WA, Foltz became profoundly interested in pediatric neurosurgery. Hydrocephalus became would become another major interest. Indeed, he’d work on it for the remainder of his career.

Accomplishments and awards 

At the University of Washington, Foltz received a John R. and Mary Markle scholarship in Medical Science to support his coma and cingulum studies. During that time he became committed to academic neurosurgery. In 1965, Foltz He became a full Professor in Neurological Surgery at the university.

Foltz developed selective frontal leuotomy cingulotomy at the university, working with Dr. Arthur Ward.

In 1969, Foltz became Chairman of Neurosurgery at the University of California, Irvine. There he did experimental work in hydrocephalus, his emphasis being on CSF molecular transport studies in dogs and cats. Foltz trained twenty neurosurgeons under the program.

Foltz held offices in the Western Neurosurgical Society, Society of Neurological Surgeons, Neurosurgical Society of America, and Society of Neurological Surgeons of Orange County. He became Emeritus Professor of Neurological Surgery in 1989.

Miscellany 
After graduating from Medical School in 1943, Foltz married Katherine Crosby, a University of Michigan microbiologist. 
Foltz was fond of sailboat racing, backpacking, photography, classical music, and opera. 
He had five children, five grandchildren, and one great grandchild.

Publications

References 

American neuroscientists
1919 births
2013 deaths
University of Michigan Medical School alumni
United States Navy personnel of World War II
Michigan State University alumni